Malcolm 'Mal' Hughes (1932-2008) was an English international lawn and indoor bowler.

Bowls career

World Championships
Hughes won a gold medal in the team event (Leonard Cup) at the 1980 World Outdoor Bowls Championship in Melbourne with Tony Allcock, David Bryant, Jimmy Hobday and John Bell.

Commonwealth Games
Hughes competed for England at the 1978 Commonwealth Games in the fours.

National
He was the pairs champion with George Turley at the 1983 National Championships bowling for Eldon Grove BC of Durham.

Personal life
Hughes was the manager of Hartlepool Indoor Bowls Club up until the time he died in 2008.

References

1932 births
2008 deaths
English male bowls players
Bowls World Champions
Bowls players at the 1978 Commonwealth Games
Commonwealth Games competitors for England